Zvyozdny gorodok is a closed urban locality (a work settlement) in Moscow Oblast, Russia. It is home to the military research and space training facility known as Star City in English. Population:

History
For most of its history, the space training center known in English as Star City was in jurisdiction of the Soviet and then Russian military. However, in August 1996, due to the changes in legislation the center became subordinated both to the Ministry of Defense and to the Roscosmos. This double status remained in effect until October 1, 2008, when the center was re-organized and subordinated directly and solely to the Roscosmos. As a result, the status of the territory of Star City was changed from military to civil. A closed administrative-territorial formation was established on the territory of the closed military townlet #1 (Star City's official designation) on January 19, 2009. On August 5, 2009, Boris Gromov, the Governor of Moscow Oblast, issued a Resolution which transformed the military townlet into an urban-type settlement. On October 29, the urban-type settlement was named "Zvyozdny gorodok"; however, as of 2011, this name is not yet official pending the approval by the Government of Russia.

Administrative and municipal status
Within the framework of administrative divisions, it is incorporated as the closed administrative-territorial formation of Zvyozdny gorodok—an administrative unit with the status equal to that of the districts. As a municipal division, the closed administrative-territorial formation of Zvyozdny gorodok is incorporated as Zvyozdny gorodok Urban Okrug.

Twin towns
 Slovenske Konjice, Slovenia

References

Notes

Sources

Urban-type settlements in Moscow Oblast
Closed cities
Populated places established in 2009